Douglas Franklin Martin (born February 4, 1963) American football coach and former quarterback, who is the former head football coach of the New Mexico State Aggies. He played college football at Kentucky for coach Fran Curci and Jerry Claiborne from 1981 to 1984. He then served as the head coach of the Kent State Golden Flashes (2004–2010).

Coaching career

East Carolina
In 1992, Martin became an assistant coach at East Carolina University. He coached the Pirates tight ends and special teams his first two years and then took over the wide receivers. In 1996, he was promoted to offensive coordinator, a position he held until 2002.

Kent State
In 2004, Martin succeeded Dean Pees as head coach of the Kent State Golden Flashes football team. In his seven seasons in Kent, Martin had an overall record of 29–53. He resigned after the 2010 season finale win against Ohio University.

New Mexico State
Martin was announced as offensive coordinator and quarterbacks coach for the New Mexico State Aggies on March 9, 2011.

Boston College
Martin was named offensive coordinator and quarterbacks coach at Boston College by head coach Frank Spaziani on December 22, 2011.

Return to New Mexico State
In 2013, Martin was named Head coach of the Aggies. In his first season, he led them to a 2-10 record, a one-game improvement from the previous year. He led them to the same record the following year. He led them to 3-9 records in 2015 and 2016. In 2017, he led them to a 6-6 record. This was the first time the Aggies were bowl eligible since 2002. The Aggies were invited to the 2017 Arizona Bowl, their first bowl game appearance since 1960. Of the 18 head coaches of the program over its history, he is only the eighth to have lasted five full seasons and the first in the 21st century. In 2017, Martin ended the 57-year bowl drought at NMSU by defeating Utah State at the Arizona Bowl. In 2021, Aggies athletic director Mario Moccia said after New Mexico State (2-10) ended its regular season by beating UMass that Martin's contract, which is set to expire after the season, would not be renewed.

Head coaching record

References

1963 births
Living people
American football quarterbacks
Boston College Eagles football coaches
Coaches of American football from Tennessee
East Carolina Pirates football coaches
East Tennessee State Buccaneers football coaches
Kent State Golden Flashes football coaches
Kentucky Wildcats football coaches
Kentucky Wildcats football players
New Mexico State Aggies football coaches
People from Oak Ridge, Tennessee
Players of American football from Tennessee